The Canadian province of Saskatchewan held municipal elections in its cities, town, villages and odd-numbered rural municipalities on October 24, 2012.

Listed are the results of selected municipal mayoral and city councillor races across the province.

Estevan

Humboldt

Lloydminster

Martensville

Meadow Lake

Melfort

Moose Jaw

North Battleford

Prince Albert

Regina
City of Regina 2012 Live Election Results.

Mayor

Council

Saskatoon
Results are unofficial until confirmed by the City Clerk's office after the election.

Mayor

Council

Swift Current

Warman

Weyburn

Yorkton

References

Municipal elections in Saskatchewan
Saskatchewan municipal
2012 in Saskatchewan
October 2012 events in Canada